Gen. Thomas J. Stewart Memorial Armory, also known as Norristown Armory, is a historic National Guard armory located at Norristown, Montgomery County, Pennsylvania.  It was built in 1927-1928, and is a "T"-plan building consisting of a two-story administration building with a two-story rear drill hall section executed in the Classical Revival style. The building is constructed of yellow brick on a concrete foundation, with decorative stonework and a parapet.

It was added to the National Register of Historic Places in 1991.

References

Armories on the National Register of Historic Places in Pennsylvania
Neoclassical architecture in Pennsylvania
Infrastructure completed in 1928
Buildings and structures in Montgomery County, Pennsylvania
National Register of Historic Places in Montgomery County, Pennsylvania